William Vorrath (21 October 1904 – 7 June 1934) was a New Zealand cricketer. Vorrath played six first-class matches for Otago between 1927 and 1930. He scored one century, 103 not out, batting at number eight, against Wellington in 1927–28.

He also played Rugby league for Otago and South Island. He died in hospital after an illness.

See also
 List of Otago representative cricketers

References

External links
 

1904 births
1934 deaths
Cricketers from Dunedin
New Zealand cricketers
New Zealand rugby league players
Otago cricketers
Otago rugby league team players
Rugby league players from Dunedin
South Island rugby league team players